The Torneo Regional del NOA (NorOeste Argentino – Argentine North-West), also known as Torneo del Noroeste, is a regional rugby union competition in Argentina.

Originally, only clubs from the Tucumán RU took part. In successive editions the competition added clubs from the unions of Salta, Jujuy and Santiago del Estero. This yearly tournament has traditionally been dominated by Tucumán clubs. Clubs from the other 3 provinces have yet to win a title.

Universitario is the most successful team, with 24 titles won to date.

History
Rugby was first played in Tucumán in 1915 but the first official rugby team in the province –Club Natación y Gimnasia– would only be formed in 1936. Six years later Tucumán Rugby Club was founded, followed by Universitario Rugby Club in 1943 and Cardenales Rugby Club in 1944.

Those four clubs would go on to found the "Unión de Rugby del Norte" on 29 February 1944.

Although the URN was based in Tucumán Province it also dealt with fledgling clubs from the neighbouring provinces of Salta, Jujuy and Santiago del Estero. Later these provinces would go on to form their own unions in 1951, 1966 and 1968 respectively.

Although all four provinces take part in the regional Torneo del Noroeste, they still organise their own local competitions.

Format
As of 2018, 14 clubs from all 4 provinces take part in the tournament. The competition is divided into two zones. The four best placed teams qualify to "Zona Campeonato" to crown the champion of the season. The tournament uses a promotion and relegation system.

Champion and runner-up of Torneo del Noroeste qualify for the Nacional de Clubes, the main club competition of Argentina while the other best placed teams qualify for Torneo del Interior, the national club competition outside Buenos Aires.

Championships

Results 

Notes

Titles by team

References

External links
Torneo Regional del NOA on URT website
Norte Rugby
Unión de Rugby de Tucumán
Unión Santiagueña de Rugby
Unión Jujeña de Rugby
Unión de Rugby de Salta

Rugby union leagues in Argentina
1944 establishments in Argentina